Local elections took place in Pasig on Monday, May 13, 2019, as part of the 2019 Philippine general election.

Voters elected a mayor, a vice mayor, and a total of 12 councilors - six from each of the city's two districts. The election for the member from the lone legislative district of Pasig to the Philippine House of Representatives was also held concurrently.

The election saw Vico Sotto of the Aksyon Demokratiko party winning the mayoral election against the incumbent Robert Eusebio of the Nacionalista Party, which ended the 27-year rule of the Eusebio family in Pasig. Incumbent vice mayor and Eusebio's running mate Iyo Christian Bernardo was re-elected to a third term as vice mayor unopposed. Candidates for councilor running under Eusebio's ticket called Team Bobby won all of the seats in the City Council.

Background 
Robert Eusebio was elected mayor of Pasig in 2016, and was previously mayor for two consecutive terms from 2007 until 2013. He was seeking to be re-elected to a second consecutive term since his election in 2016, which would have been his fourth total term as mayor.

Robert Eusebio is part of the Eusebio family who have dominated Pasig politics since 1992. His father Vicente was mayor of Pasig for three consecutive terms from 1992 until 2001 and for another term from 2004 until 2007. His mother Soledad was mayor for from 2001 to 2004, while his wife Maribel was mayor from 2013 to 2016. His brother Ricky was the member from Pasig to the House of Representatives from 2016 until 2019.

Vico Sotto was a first-term councilor for Pasig's first district who was elected in his first run for a public office in 2016, which saw him ranking first among 13 candidates in his district. In his term as councilor, Sotto authored City Ordinance No. 37 also known as The Pasig Transparency Mechanism Ordinance, which was signed in September 13, 2018. He also served as the chairman of Pasig’s public relations and information committee during his term as city councilor.

Candidates

Team Bobby

Team Pagbabago

No ticket 

 Andy Cheng, PDP–Laban president in Pasig and candidate for councilor in Pasig's first district. He unsuccessfully ran for councilor in Pasig's first district in 2016 under the Liberal Party.

Opinion polls

Results

Mayor

Vice Mayor

District representative

City Council

By district

1st District

|-bgcolor=black
|colspan=25|

2nd District 

|-bgcolor=black
|colspan=6|

Notes
 A^ Incumbent Andy Santiago died on June 14, 2019. His wife, Edith, was named as his substitute, later she took her office on October 16, 2019.
 B^ Incumbent Rodrigo Asilo died on May 27, 2021. His daughter, Syvel, was named as his substitute, later she took her office on January 4, 2022.

References

2019 Philippine local elections
Elections in Pasig
May 2019 events in the Philippines
2019 elections in Metro Manila